Strathmore is a locality split between the Shire of Mareeba and the Shire of Etheridge, in Queensland, Australia. In the  Strathmore had a population of 12 people.

Geography 
The Einasleigh River splits the locality between the two local government areas with Shire of Mareeba to the north and Shire of Etheridge to the south.

The land use is grazing on native vegetation.

History 
In the  Strathmore had a population of 12 people.

Economy 
There are a number of homesteads in the locality:

 Minnies Outstation, part of Strathmore
 Strathmore

Transport 
There are a number of airstrips in the locality:

 Minnies Outstation airstrip

 Strathmore Airstrip #1

 Strathmore Airstrip #2

References 

Shire of Mareeba
Shire of Etheridge
Localities in Queensland